The 1932 United States presidential election in North Dakota took place on November 8, 1932, as part of the 1932 United States presidential election. Voters chose four representatives, or electors, to the Electoral College, who voted for president and vice president.

Background
Ever since statehood, North Dakota had been overwhelmingly Republican at state level and in many presidential elections, although progressive Democrat Woodrow Wilson was able to carry the state in both his campaigns in 1912 and 1916, in the second due to his anti-war platform. In the following three elections, the state’s voting would be shaped by its extreme isolationism in the aftermath of President Wilson’s pushing of the nation into World War I and his “League of Nations” proposal, to which the Russian-Germans who dominated North Dakota’s populace were vehemently opposed. The Peace Garden State thus shifted markedly from voting four-to-one for Warren G. Harding against the pro-League James M. Cox in 1920, to being the second-strongest state for Robert La Follette under the Nonpartisan League banner in 1924, to strong pro-Catholic and anti-Prohibition voting for Al Smith in 1928 that made the state 7 points more Democratic than the nation at-large.

During the 1910s, North Dakota had been one of the major centres of Socialist and farmer radicalism. With the coming of the Depression, this radicalism returned, although unlike with the Socialist Party and later with La Follette, there was sharp division over whom to support in the ensuing presidential election, with some supporting veteran Populist and free silver advocate  “Coin” Harvey and other supporting the Socialist or Communist Parties. Nonetheless, grievances of farmers against the Republicans had existed before incumbent Herbert Hoover’s election in 1928. Democratic nominee and New York Governor Franklin D. Roosevelt was himself well-equipped to cater for this issue. After he had won the state’s primary against Oklahoma populist “Alfalfa Bill” Murray, Roosevelt cultivated favor with North Dakota congressmen William Lemke, Lynn J. Frazier and Gerald P. Nye, and as Smith had in 1928, gained the support of former Senator Henry C. Hansbrough. Roosevelt’s proposal to lessen the Smoot-Hawley Tariff to increase farmers’ foreign purchasing power, and to reduce acreage to increase prices for farmers further added to his support in this most agrarian state. Late proposals by Hoover to offer relief failed to make any impression, especially as the President had refused to support the bankruptcy and refinance bills advocated by Senator Frazier.

Vote
The earlier straw poll in the state, at the end of the third week of October, had Roosevelt leading by about seven-to-four over Hoover, and this poll had been taken amongst voters who had given Hoover a larger margin over Al Smith than North Dakota as a whole had. By the weekend preceding the poll, further polls seemed to confirm Hoover’s hopes of carrying the state as forlorn, and as it turned out Roosevelt carried the state by a larger margin than even the latest polls expected. With the farming areas decimated by drought, Hoover support held up best in the cities of the Red River valley, but FDR still carried all 53 counties by double-digit majorities.

Roosevelt became the first Democrat to win a majority of North Dakota’s vote in the presidential election, a feat he emulated in 1936 but which has otherwise only been achieved by Lyndon B. Johnson in 1964. His 69.59 percent of the vote is the best Democratic performance in North Dakota presidential election history as well as the highest raw vote total for a Democrat in the state.

Results

Results by county

See also
 United States presidential elections in North Dakota

References

North Dakota
1932
1932 North Dakota elections